Yukio Araki (Araki Yukio, March 10, 1928 – May 27, 1945) was a Japanese aviator of the Imperial Japanese Army during World War II. As a kamikaze pilot and member of the 72nd Shinbu Squadron, Araki died on May 27, 1945, during the Battle of Okinawa when he flew his bomb-laden Mitsubishi Ki-51 to deliberately crash into the USS Braine. It is speculated that Araki and one other pilot hit and damaged the ship, killing 66 of its crew. At 17 years old, Araki was one of the youngest kamikaze pilots.

Biography
Araki Yukio was born on March 10, 1928, in Miyamae, Kiryu, Gunma Prefecture. At the age of fifteen he joined the Imperial Japanese Army Air Service's Youth Pilot Training Program. In or around September 1943, he began training at the Tachiarai Air Base. After he graduated he started working at Metabaru Air Field, and in 1944 he got work at Heijo (now known as Pyongyang), Korea. On 27 May 1945, Araki took off from Bansei Airfield, at Bansei (now part of Minamisatsuma), Kawanabe District, Kagoshima Prefecture in a Mitsubishi Ki-51 on a kamikaze mission. At the age of seventeen, Araki is one of the youngest known kamikaze pilots. It has been speculated that his plane was one of two that struck the USS Braine, killing 66 of its crew; however, the ship did not sink.

Araki had been home in April 1945, and left letters for his family, to be opened upon the news of his death. The letter to his parents noted:

Please find pleasure in your desire for my loyalty to the emperor and devotion to parents.

I have no regrets. I just go forward on my path.

Prior to his mission, and in accordance with the custom of the kamikaze pilots, Araki cut a lock of his hair and clipped his fingernails, which together were to be sent to his parents following his death. These were sent to his family for burial in a cemetery in Kiryu.

Cultural references
In 2004, Tsuneyuki Mori published Araki's biography, entitled Yuki Died at 17 in a Kamikaze Attack . Mori is one of Japan's most noted authors of books about the kamikaze pilots and their world.

See also
Bansei Tokkō Peace Museum
72nd Shinbu Squadron

References

External links

"Who Became Kamikaze Pilots, and How Did They Feel Towards Their Suicide Mission" by Mako Sasaki (1997, 36 pdfs) makes use of Araki's diary and letters
Yukio Araki (1928–1945) Find a Grave Memorial 

Japanese aviators
Japanese military personnel killed in World War II
Japanese military personnel who committed suicide
Imperial Japanese Army personnel of World War II
Japanese World War II pilots
Kamikaze pilots
People from Gunma Prefecture
People from Kiryū, Gunma
People of Shōwa-period Japan
People of the Empire of Japan
Suicides in Japan
1928 births
1945 deaths
Imperial Japanese Army soldiers
Child soldiers in World War II